Nicola Boem (born 27 September 1989) is an Italian former racing cyclist, who competed professionally between 2013 and 2017, all for the  team.

He competed in the Giro d'Italia five times, winning Stage 10 of the 2015 Giro d'Italia in solo fashion after attacking his breakaway companions.

Major results

2007
 2nd Time trial, National Junior Road Championships
2009
 2nd Giro del Belvedere
 5th Coppa San Geo
2010
 1st Stage 6 Giro della Valle d'Aosta
 3rd Trofeo Franco Balestra
 8th Giro del Belvedere
2011
 1st Giro del Belvedere
 2nd Trofeo Franco Balestra
 3rd Overall Giro del Veneto e delle Dolomiti
 5th Overall Coupe des nations Ville Saguenay
 6th Trofeo Edil C
2012
 2nd Coppa San Geo
 2nd Trofeo Edil C
2014
 1st Stage 6 Danmark Rundt
2015
 Giro d'Italia
1st Stage 10
Held  after Stages 10–12
2017
 1st  Sprints classification Dubai Tour

Grand Tour general classification results timeline

References

External links

1989 births
Living people
Italian male cyclists
People from San Donà di Piave
Italian Giro d'Italia stage winners
Cyclists from the Metropolitan City of Venice